Johnswood is a historic house at 10314 Cantrell Road in Little Rock, Arkansas.  It is a single-story structure, its main section built out of sandstone and capped by a side gable roof, with an attached wood frame section on the left end, with a front-facing gable roof.  The main entrance is located in the center of the stone section, sheltered by a small gabled porch.  The house was built in 1941 to a design by Maximilian F. Mayer for Arkansas authors John Gould Fletcher and Charlie May Simon.  The house was at that time well outside the bounds of Little Rock in a rural setting, and was written about by Simon in an autobiographical work called Johnswood.

The house was listed on the National Register of Historic Places in 1994.

See also
National Register of Historic Places listings in Little Rock, Arkansas

References

Houses on the National Register of Historic Places in Arkansas
Colonial Revival architecture in Arkansas
Houses completed in 1941
Houses in Little Rock, Arkansas
National Register of Historic Places in Little Rock, Arkansas